The Bureau of Corrections (literally "Bureau of Prisons", which was the name of the agency from 1905 to 1989; abbreviated BuCor) is an agency of the Department of Justice which is charged with the custody and rehabilitation of national offenders, who have been sentenced to three years of imprisonment or more. The agency has its headquarters in the New Bilibid Prison Reservation in Muntinlupa.

Organization
It is currently headed by Gregorio Catapang Jr. in an Officer-in-Charge capacity. The bureau has 2,862 employees, 61% of whom are custodial (uniformed) officers, 33% are non-uniformed personnel and 6% are members of the medical service.

Leadership
 Commander-in-Chief: President Bongbong Marcos
 Secretary of Justice (SoJ): Atty. Jesus Crispin C. Remulla
 Director-General, Bureau of Corrections (DG, BUCOR): Asec. Gregorio Catapang Jr.
 Deputy Director-General for Administration (DDGA): Corrections S/Supt. Geraldo I. Aro (OIC)
 Deputy Director-General for Security and Operations (DDGSO): Asec. Angelina L. Bautista
 Deputy Director-General for Reformation (DDGR): Corrections Technical S/Supt. Ma. Cecilia V. Villanueva (OIC)

Command Leadership Structure
 The President of the Philippines as Commander-in-Chief
 The Secretary of Justice
 The Director General of the Bureau of Corrections (DG, BUCOR; with the Rank of Undersecretary donning the 4-Star rank)
 The Deputy Director General for Administration (DDGA; with the Rank of Assistant Secretary donning the 3-Star rank)
 The Deputy Director General for Security and Operations (DDGSO;  with the Rank of Assistant Secretary donning the 3-Star rank)
 The Deputy Director General for Reformation (DDGR;  with the Rank of Assistant Secretary donning the 3-Star rank)

National Headquarters 
 Office of the Director-General
 Office of the Deputy Director-General for Administration
 Office of the Deputy Director-General for Security and Operations
 Office of the Deputy Director-General for Reformation
 BUCOR Directorial Staff

Directorates 
 Directorate for Administration
 Directorate for External Relations
 Directorate for Finance and Logistics
 Directorate for Health Service
 Directorate for Planning and Management
 Directorate for Reception Diagnostic
 Directorate for Reformation
 Directorate for Security and Operations
 Directorate for Standards and Development

Support Services
 Contact Center ng Bayan
 Corrections Training School
 BUCOR Business Center
 Public Information Office
 Legal Service
 Internal Affairs Service
 Administrative Division
 Communication and Management Section
 Anti-Red Tape Act Section
 Cashier Section
 Records Section
 Human Resource Division
 General Services Division
 Planning and Statistics Division
 Management Division
 Information and Communications Technology Division
 Budget Division
 Accounting Division
 Supply Division
 Project Management and Doctrine Development Division
 Intelligence and Investigation Division
 Inmate Documents and Processing Division
 Communications and Tactical Operations Division
 Escorting Group
 Education and Training Division
 Moral and Spiritual Division
 Behavior Modification Division
 Inmate Sports and Recreation Division
 Work and Livelihood Division
 Assessment and Program Monitoring Division
 Case Management Division
 External Affairs Division

Mission
TO PROTECT THE PUBLIC BY SAFEKEEPING AND REFORMING PERSONS UNDER OUR CUSTODY ADHERING TO INTERNATIONAL STANDARDS OF CORRECTIONS SERVICE.

Mandate
SAFEKEEPING AND INSTITUTING REFORMATION PROGRAMS TO NATIONAL INMATES SENTENCED TO MORE THAN 3 YEARS.

Units
The Bureau of Corrections currently have 7 operating units located nationwide:

 Correctional Institution for Women (CIW) in Mandaluyong / and The CIW Mindanao, Santo Tomas, Davao del Norte
 New Bilibid Prison in Muntinlupa
Maximum Security Compound
Minimum Security Compound
Medium Security Compound 
 Sablayan Prison and Penal Farm in Occidental Mindoro
 Iwahig Prison and Penal Farm in Puerto Princesa City, Palawan
 Leyte Regional Prison in Abuyog, Leyte
 San Ramon Prison and Penal Farm in Zamboanga City
 Davao Prison and Penal Farm in Braulio E. Dujali, Davao del Norte

Ranks 

The following ranks are in force in the BuCor. While the Bureau forms part of the Department of Justice, its ranks follow those of the uniformed services in the Department of the Interior and Local Government.

Commissioned Officers
Corrections Director General (Undersecretary)
Corrections Deputy Director General for Administration (Assistant Secretary)
Corrections Deputy Director General for Security and Operations (Assistant Secretary)
Corrections Deputy Director General for Reformation (Assistant Secretary)
Corrections Chief Superintendent (Brig. General)
Corrections Senior Superintendent (Colonel)
Corrections Superintendent (Lt. Col.)
Corrections Chief Inspector (Major)
Corrections Senior Inspector (Captain)
Corrections Inspector (Lieutenant)

Non- Commissioned Officers
Corrections Senior Officer 4 (Executive Master Sergeant)
Corrections Senior Officer 3 (Chief Master Sergeant)
Corrections Senior Officer 2 (Senior Master Sergeant)
Corrections Senior Officer 1 (Master Sergeant)
Corrections Officer 3 (Staff Sergeant)
Corrections Officer 2 (Corporal)
Corrections Officer 1 (Private)

Rank system until 1992 
While the BuCor reports to the Department of Justice, in the past it sported a military rank system mirroring the former Integrated National Police and therefore similar to the Chilean Gendarmerie and the Italian Corpo degli Agenti di Custodia. Until 1989 officers and agents sported "Prisons" in their rank title.

History

Spanish colonial era

The Old Bilibid Prison which was located on Oroquieta Street in Manila was established in 1847 and by a Royal Decree formally opened on April 10, 1866. On August 21, 1870, the San Ramon Prison and Penal Farm was established in Zamboanga City for Muslim and political prisoners opposed to the rule of Spain.

American colonial era
The Iuhit penal Settlement now known as Iwahig Prison and Penal Farm was established in 1904 by the Americans in 28,072 hectares of land. The land areas expanded to 40,000 hectares in the late 1950s. and expanded again to 41,007 hectares by virtue of Executive Order No. 67 issued by Governor Newton Gilbert on October 15, 1912.

The Bureau of Prisons was created under the Reorganization Act of 1905 as an agency under the Department of Commerce and Police. The Reorganization Act also re-established the San Ramon Prison in 1907 which was destroyed during the Spanish–American War in 1898. The prison was placed under the Bureau of Prisons and receive prisoners in Mindanao.

The Correctional Institution for Women was founded on November 27, 1929, by virtue of Act No. 3579 as the first and only prison for women in the Philippines. Later, on January 21, 1932, the bureau opened the Davao Penal Colony in Southern Mindanao.

The New Bilibid Prison was established in 1935 in Muntinlupa due to the increased rate of prisoners.

Contemporary era
Proclamation No. 72 issued on September 26, 1954, established the Sablayan Prison and Penal Farm in Occidental Mindoro, and the Leyte Regional Prison was established on January 16, 1973, under Proclamation No. 1101.

The Administrative Code of 1987 and Proclamation No. 495, issued on November 22, 1989, changed the agency's name to the current Bureau of Corrections from Bureau of Prisons.

List of Director Generals

Logo
The logo of the bureau represents the government agency's mandate, the rehabilitation of inmate. The logo focuses on the man in prison as the main concern of rehabilitation. It presents man behind bars, but who looks outwards with the hope of rejoining the free community. The 7 rays of the sun represent the 7 operating prisons and penal farms who carry out the reformation programs of the bureau. The color green symbolizes hope. The color orange is symbolic of happiness. The bar of justice represents the Philippine justice system.

Capital punishment

When the Philippines had the death penalty, male inmates condemned to death were held at New Bilibid Prison and female inmates condemned to death were held at Correctional Institution for Women (Mandaluyong). The death chamber for inmates to be electrocuted was in Building 14, within the Maximum Security Compound of New Bilibid. The Bureau of Corrections (BuCor) Museum previously served as the lethal injection chamber.

References

External links

 Bureau of Corrections

Department of Justice (Philippines)
Law enforcement in the Philippines
Prison and correctional agencies